Norman Lenardon (born October 20, 1933) was a Canadian ice hockey player with the Trail Smoke Eaters. He scored the winning goal to help Canada secure a gold medal at the 1961 World Ice Hockey Championships in Switzerland. He also played with the Rossland Warriors and Seattle Americans.

References

1933 births
Living people
Canadian ice hockey right wingers
Sportspeople from Trail, British Columbia
Ice hockey people from British Columbia